State Road 67 in the U.S. State of Indiana cuts a diagonal route from southwest to northeast across the state from the north side of Vincennes to Indianapolis to the Ohio state line, where it becomes State Route 29 east of Bryant.

Route description
State Road 67 is a two-lane highway, with intermittent stretches of four-lane undivided highway, from Vincennes to near Martinsville, where it becomes a four-lane limited-access highway.

Once SR 67 reaches Indianapolis, as Kentucky Avenue, it overlaps Interstate 465 around the south and east sides of the city until Exit 42, where SR 67 and U.S. Highway 36 depart the city to the northeast as Pendleton Pike. U.S. Highway 36 splits off from State Road 67 in Pendleton and proceeds east.

SR 67 joins Interstate 69 from Anderson to Daleville, where it leaves the interstate and becomes an expressway bypass that serves the south and east sides of Muncie.

Northeast of Muncie, SR 67 wraps up its diagonal run in the same manner as it began:  as a rural, two-lane highway.  Portions of the route overlap others.

History
SR 67 was so numbered and aligned because it was planned as a potential northeastern extension of U.S. Route 67. US 67 was later extended northward away from Indiana.

Indianapolis
SR 67 was routed through downtown before the opening of I-465. SR 67 overlapped US 36 for most of the way. The route consisted of Pendleton Pike, then turned right onto 38th Street. The routes then overlapped U.S. 421 when they turned left onto Dr. Martin Luther King Jr. Street. After I-65, the road becomes West Street with U.S. 52 briefly overlapping US 36/US 421/SR 67. At Washington Street (westbound) and Maryland Street (eastbound)(both U.S. 40), US 36/52/421 separated from SR 67. US 36 went onto Washington Street (it enters West Street after turning left from Maryland Street). US 52/421 turned left onto Maryland Street (they enter West Street after turning right from Washington Street). After the US 40 intersections, SR 67 was left alone on West Street. For a few feet, the road split into two one-way roads. Missouri Street northbound, and West Street southbound. It then turned right onto Kentucky Avenue (from Kentucky Avenue, SR 67 went on South Street, then turned left onto Missouri Street). It traveled onto Kentucky Avenue for about one mile, then onto Morris and Harding Streets for another mile. From there, SR 67 went onto Kentucky Avenue for the rest of the way.

Major intersections

Related routes
 is a connector between SR 67 in Albany and SR 26.
 exists as two separate disconnected segments in Hendricks and Boone counties.

References

067
Transportation in Indianapolis
Transportation in Knox County, Indiana
Transportation in Greene County, Indiana
Transportation in Owen County, Indiana
Transportation in Morgan County, Indiana
Transportation in Hendricks County, Indiana
Transportation in Marion County, Indiana
Transportation in Hancock County, Indiana
Transportation in Madison County, Indiana
Transportation in Delaware County, Indiana
Transportation in Jay County, Indiana